Tomasz Egidiusz Kuszłejko (1821 – 1894) – participant of the Uprising of 1863.

Early life 
He was an officer of the Imperial Russian Army. He went into reserve and lived in the Bartkūniškiai manor near Kėdainiai. Tomasz Kuszłejko was the owner of the Bartkūniškis manor.

Uprising of 1863 
In March 1863, he was mobilised by Bolesław Dłuski to form a unit in the Krakės forests, near his manor. His unit of about 800 rebels, mostly peasants, concentrated in the Krakiai forest near Kuszłejko's manor, chose him as commander. This unit was called the Nevėžis Regiment. In addition to organising the unit, Kuszłejko enfranchised the peasants of his manor. The regiment fought between Krakės and Lenčiai close to Ažytėnai, then in  near , and finally near  and near Viekšniai (9 June 1863). Kuszłejko recruited new rebels through the regiment's fighters, inciting the public against Russian occupation. Among the recruiters was Adomas Bitė, who was very trusted by the local peasants. The regiment was later divided into smaller independent groups.

In emigration 
In autumn 1863, he emigrated and lived in France. He took an active part in the political life of emigration. In 1867, he was one of the initiators of the split and the formation of the right-wing so-called "Ogół" Organisation.

Last years 
Probably after 1868 he returned from emigration and settled in Galicia, mostly Lviv, from 1868. For several years he was involved in a court dispute over part of his estate, which the Kaniewski brothers were trying to seize.  He died from a heart attack in Zamarstyniv in 1894.

References

Sources 

 

1821 births
1894 deaths
19th-century Lithuanian nobility
January Uprising participants